Tony Grey (born March 25, 1975, in Newcastle, England) is an English bass player, composer, producer, author and award winning music educator; Grey studied at Berklee College of Music in Boston and graduated receiving the "Outstanding Performer" Award in 2001. Grey is best known for his 6-string electric bass technique, melodic improvisation and warm tone as well as being a long-time member of pianist Hiromi's trio. Grey has performed and recorded with a wide range of musicians, such as Hiromi, John McLaughlin, Herbie Hancock, Wayne Shorter, Reeves Gabrels, Kelly Buchanan, Naveen Kumar, Tomoyasu Hotei, Gavin DeGraw, Dennis Chambers, Bill Evans, Zach Alford, Zakier Hussain, Gregorie Maret, Gary Husband, Mino Cinelu, Brian Blade, Mike Stern, Karsh Kale, Wayne Krantz, Steve Lukather, Branford Marsalis, Shaggy, Ice-T, Melanie Fiona, Dave Holland, Mark Guiliana, Kenwood Dennard, David Fiuczynski, Fabrizio Sotti, Raymond Angry, Gene Lake, Chris Dave, Falguni, Reb Beach, Deantoni Parks, Lionel Loueke and many others.

In 2004, Tony performed at New York's Lincoln Centre with David Nichtern’s band ‘Drala’ for the Dalai Lama.

Grey is the nephew of jazz guitarist John McLaughlin and carries endorsements with Fodera, Aguilar, DR Strings, Yamaha, Earthquaker Devices, TC Electronic, Keith McMillan, G&H Plugs, CME Keyboards and GruvGear. His 4-string and 6-string Signature Monarch basses were designed and crafted by Fodera, a Brooklyn-based handcrafted guitar company.

Grey developed the Tony Grey Bass Academy, an online educational platform for students interested in a structured and comprehensive music education, where students are encouraged to study at their own pace. The Academy was initially intended to be a companion for his instructional book, Tony Grey Bass Academy; however, the Academy exceeded its initial vision and has been designed to take players from the beginning of their journey through music, all the way to the very end and beyond, learning music creatively rather than mechanically—a Philosophy developed by Grey, which now leads thousands of students to becoming the next generation of bass virtuosos.

Awards 
 Outstanding Performer Award, Berklee College of Music, 2001
 Outstanding Contribution to Jazz, IAJE, 2004
 Jazz Album of the Year, Unknown Angels, Independent Music Awards, 2011

Discography 
Solo
 Moving (2004)
 Chasing Shadows (2008)
 Unknown Angels (2010)
 Elevation (2013)
 Galactic Duo (2017)

With John McLaughlin
 Industrial Zen (2006)
 Essential John McLaughlin (2007)

With Hiromi
 Brain (2004)
 Spiral (2006)
 Time Control (2007)
 Beyond Standard (2008)

With Oli Rockberger
 Hush Now (2005)

With Kelly Buchanon
 The Match (2002)

Books 
 Tony Grey 6 String Bass Method, Yamaha
 Tony Grey Bass Academy Instructional Book, Hal Leonard
 Vertical Fingering Patterns: 4-5-6 String Bass

Video 
 Hiromi Trio
 Hiromi Sonic Bloom
 Tomoyasu Hotei

References

External links 

Tony Grey Bass Academy Official Website

Living people
British jazz bass guitarists
Berklee College of Music alumni
1975 births
Musicians from Newcastle upon Tyne
21st-century English bass guitarists